Adams Glacier is a small glacier immediately south of Miers Glacier in Victoria Land. It was named by the New Zealand Northern Survey Party of the Commonwealth Trans-Antarctic Expedition (1956–58) after Lieutenant (later Sir) Jameson Adams, second in command of the shore party of the British Antarctic Expedition (1907–09), who was one of the men to accompany Ernest Shackleton to within  of the South Pole.

The Keyhole, a narrow ice-carved defile, separates the Adams Glacier from Hidden Valley. It provides the only low-level entrance to Hidden Valley, and is the key to easy passage between Lake Miers and Ward Glacier. Named by the New Zealand Victoria University's Antarctic Expeditions (VUWAE) who used it on several occasions during the summer of 1960-61. Lake Keyhole is a very small lake on the south, or Hidden Valley side of The Keyhole. It was named by VUWAE for its proximity to The Keyhole.

See also
 List of glaciers in the Antarctic
 Aorta Ridge, a ridge that separates upper Miers Glacier from Adams Glacier

References

External links

Glaciers of Scott Coast